The Omaha Knights was the name of three minor league professional ice hockey teams from 1959 to 1965 and from 1966 to 1975, based in Omaha, Nebraska, at the Ak-Sar-Ben Arena. The Knights were founded in 1959 as members of the International Hockey League. Following the 1962-63 season the team moved to Toledo, Ohio, becoming the Toledo Blades. A new Knights team joined the Central Professional Hockey League for the 1963-64 season. This second iteration of the Knights moved to Houston to become the Houston Apollos after the 1964-65 season. After a year without a team, hockey returned to Omaha for the 1966-67 season after the Minnesota Rangers moved from Saint Paul, Minnesota, to vacate the market that the National Hockey League's Minnesota North Stars would soon occupy. The CPHL was renamed the Central Hockey League in 1968, where the Knights continued to play until they folded after the 1974–75 season.

Ken Wilson was the general manager from 1960–1963. Goaltender Glenn Ramsay won the James Norris Memorial Trophy for the fewest goals against during the 1961–62 and the 1962–63 regular seasons. The Rookie of the Year Trophy was awarded to Knights' player John Gravel in 1963.

External links 
 A to Z Encyclopedia of Ice Hockey - Omaha Knights
 1962-63 Jersey - Omaha Knights
 Knights Game Puck
 HockeyDB - Omaha Knights (IHL)(1959-63)
 HockeyDB - Omaha Knights (CHL)(1963-65)
 HockeyDB - Omaha Knights (CHL)(1966-75)

Defunct ice hockey teams in the United States
International Hockey League (1945–2001) teams
Sports in Omaha, Nebraska
Ice hockey teams in Nebraska
Central Professional Hockey League teams
1959 establishments in Nebraska
1975 disestablishments in Nebraska
Ice hockey clubs established in 1959
Ice hockey clubs disestablished in 1975
Atlanta Flames minor league affiliates